Signed Sealed Delivered is the fifth studio album by English singer Craig David. It was his first and only album with Universal Motown. It was released on 29 March 2010. The album consists primarily of covers. Two of the album's tracks sample hits from the Motown era and give them a modern twist, as demonstrated with the first single from the album, "One More Lie (Standing in the Shadows)", whose chorus samples The Four Tops' 1967 Motown classic "Standing in the Shadows of Love". The second is "All Alone Tonight (Stop, Look, Listen)" which samples Diana Ross and Marvin Gaye's version of "Stop, Look, Listen (To Your Heart)". The only original song is the album's last track, "This Could Be Love".

Signed Sealed Delivered entered the UK Albums Chart at number 13. As of January 2016, the album had sold 33,779 copies in the United Kingdom.

Background and composition
Craig David's first album with his new label, Universal Motown, is a collection of Motown covers and songs with Motown samples, and is David's first album in three years. He covers Stevie Wonder, Otis Redding and Marvin Gaye amongst others, and gives these classic songs a modern twist. Signed Sealed Delivered includes the single "One More Lie (Standing in the Shadows)", an original song that samples The Four Tops' hit "Standing in the Shadows of Love" in its chorus.

Critical reception
                                                                                                                    
The album received generally negative reviews from music critics. One of the few positive reviews came from The Guardian critic Carolinne Sullivan, who said that "Craig David's intention, on this Motown-dominated covers album, was to "sing the songs exactly as the original artists had", which he does, reproducing every falsetto and hiccup. The question, though, is why this still-agreeable soul star would want to make a karaoke record. It's a rum way to reignite a career – he needs to recover his mojo as an irresistibly slick R&B songwriter if he plans to return to the top of the charts".

Track listing

Personnel
Credits adapted from album's liner notes.

Jerry Abbott – producer, engineer, guitar, bass, keyboards (all tracks), programming (tracks 1–5, 7–12), handclaps (tracks 2–5, 7, 8, 10–12)
Grant Black – producer (tracks 1–5, 7–12), handclaps (tracks 2–8, 10–12)
Erkan Cetin – handclaps (tracks 2–8, 10–12)
Craig David – vocals (all tracks)
Benjamin Edwards – harmonica (track 6)
LaDonna Harley-Peters – backing vocals (tracks 2, 4, 6, 8, 9, 12)
Sharlene Hector – backing vocals (tracks 2, 4, 6, 8, 9, 12)
Wayne Hernandez – backing vocals (tracks 10, 11)
Bob Ludwig – mastering (all tracks)
Ali Tennant – backing vocals (tracks 6, 9)
Gay-Yee Westerhoff – whistle (track 7)
Jeremy Wheatley – mixing (all tracks)

Charts

References

2010 albums
Craig David albums
Motown cover albums